Jeffrey Thomas Farkas (born January 24, 1978) is an American former professional ice hockey center. He was drafted in the third round, 57th overall, by the Toronto Maple Leafs in the 1997 NHL Entry Draft. He played 11 games in the NHL for the Maple Leafs and Atlanta Thrashers between 2000 and 2003, mainly playing in the minor American Hockey League, before a spinal injury during a game forced his early retirement. Internationally Farkas played for the American national junior team at three World Junior Championships, winning a silver medal in 1997.

Playing career
After playing four seasons of college hockey for Boston College, Farkas joined the Maple Leafs' roster for the 2000 Stanley Cup Playoffs. He appeared in three games during that postseason, recording one goal. Despite his playoff success, Farkas appeared in only eight games for the Maple Leafs over the next two seasons, and three more for the Atlanta Thrashers during the 2002–03 season.

While playing for the American Hockey League's Chicago Wolves in 2003, Farkas was pushed from behind, and fell headfirst into the boards during a game against the Rochester Americans. He suffered a fractured fifth cervical vertebra and, according to medical reports, came within millimeters of being rendered quadriplegic. The injury forced Farkas' early retirement from the sport.

In 2014 Farkas was inducted into the Boston College Varsity Club Hall of Fame.

Career statistics

Regular season and playoffs

International

Awards and honors

References

External links

 

1978 births
Living people
Atlanta Thrashers players
Boston College Eagles men's ice hockey players
Chicago Wolves players
Ice hockey players from New York (state)
Manitoba Moose players
People from Williamsville, New York
People with tetraplegia
St. John's Maple Leafs players
Toronto Maple Leafs draft picks
Toronto Maple Leafs players
American men's ice hockey centers
AHCA Division I men's ice hockey All-Americans